The Procurator General of Macau is the senior law officer of Macau. The PG replaced the Attorney General of Macau in December 1999 in the new Government of Macau. The PG reports to the Secretariat for Administration and Justice. The current PG is Ip Son Sang, who was appointed on 20 December 2014.

Organization
With the exception of the title change from Attorney General to Prosecutor-General, the other office holders are the same as before the handover in 1999. The office is similar to most legal structures in Europe and North America.

List of Procurator General of Macau

Public Prosecutor
Department of Public Prosecution (Ministerio Publico) is the office charged with supervising the enforcement of laws of Macau.

The DPP consists of
 Assistant Prosecutor-General (Procurador-Geral Adjunto)
 Vong Vai Va PhD(Law) – Part-time assistant professor of law at the University of Macau
 4 Chief Prosecutors (Procuradores)
 24 Prosecutors (Delegados do Procurador)

See also
 Legal system of Macau

References

External links
 Official website

Positions of the Macau Government
Prosecution
Legal professions
1999 establishments in Macau